Raza Ahmad Rumi is a Pakistani policy analyst, journalist who has been the editor of Pakistan's English-language daily Daily Times.

He has been a development practitioner for more than two decades. He is Visiting Faculty at Cornell Institute for Public Affairs and has taught earlier at Ithaca College and New York University. Rumi has been a fellow at New America Foundation (2014); United States Institute of Peace (Sept 2014-March 2015) and a visiting fellow at National Endowment for Democracy. He is also a member of think tank at the Laboratory for Global Performance and Politics, School of Foreign Service, Georgetown University.

As a journalist, Raza is affiliated with the Daily Times (Pakistan). Earlier he worked with The Friday Times, Pakistan's foremost liberal weekly paper as a writer and an editor for a decade. Raza is also a commentator for several publications which include Foreign Policy, Huffington Post, New York Times, The Diplomat, Fair Observer, CNN  and Al Jazeera, Daily O, Scroll India, The Hindu, Indian Express, The News, Dawn, and Express Tribune.

In Pakistan, he also worked in the broadcast media as an analyst and hosted talk shows at Capital TV and Express News. Raza was also a Director at Jinnah Institute, a public policy think tank and Executive Director of Justice Network - a coalition of NGOs.

Prior to his foray into journalism and public affairs, Raza worked at the Asian Development Bank as a Governance Specialist. His areas of focus included decentralization, access to justice, institutional development and led projects in several South and Southeast Asian countries. At ADB, he also edited two publications on public administration and participatory budget making. Later, as an international development professional, Raza has also worked on designing and implementing projects for UK's Department For International Development, UNDP, UNICEF World Bank, among others. Until recently, Raza also led the Network for Asia Pacific Schools & Institutes of Public Administration and Governance. His academic papers have covered areas such as federalism, public policy choices, access to justice, citizen rights, etc.

Raza's work as a public policy practitioner builds on his stint with the Government of Pakistan's Administrative Service and United Nations Peacekeeping Mission in Kosovo where he acted as a municipal administrator in charge of local governance. In 1994, he entered the Pakistani civil service after topping the countrywide competitive examination.

Education
Raza graduated from Aitchison College, Lahore  in 1988. He holds a bachelor's degree in Economics and master's degree  in Social Planning, both from the London School of Economics.

Career

In 2012, Rumi became director of the Jinnah Institute, a policy think thank.

He is also Visiting Faculty at Cornell Institute for Public Affairs and has taught earlier at Ithaca College and New York University. Rumi has been a fellow at the New America Foundation, United States Institute of Peace and the National Endowment for Democracy. He remains a nonresident fellow at the Berkley Center for Religion, Peace and World Affairs.

Assassination attempt

On 28 March 2014, Raza was attacked by a group of assailants reportedly members of the Taliban-affiliate Lashkar-e-Jhangvi for his anti-LeJ views. Raza survived the attack, but his driver, Mustafa, was killed.
On this incident, the former director of Human Rights Watch wrote: "Miraculously, he emerged unscathed from the hail of gunfire intended for him. Raza is now in a secure location—outside Pakistan. He had no choice but to leave as the authorities felt no embarrassment in letting him know that they could not guarantee his life if he stepped outside his Lahore home. Some weeks later, the police “caught” the would-be-assassins who belong to the dreaded Taliban-affiliate Lahkar-e-Jhangvi. But police custody curtails neither the power of these terrorists nor the impunity with which they kill.."

Books authored 
He is the author of several books:
Delhi by Heart: Impressions of a Pakistani Traveller, 
The Fractious Path: Pakistan’s Democratic Transition, 
Identity, Faith and Conflict, 
Being Pakistani: Society Culture and the Arts,  a collection of essays published in June 2018 by Harper Collins, India.

References

External links
 razarumi.com
Raza Rumi, author at Naya Daur

Living people
Muhajir people
Pakistani bloggers
Pakistani columnists
Pakistani male journalists
Pakistani expatriates in the United States
Pakistani expatriates in Kosovo
Male bloggers
Year of birth missing (living people)